Miahuatlán District is located in the south of the Sierra Sur Region of the State of Oaxaca, Mexico.

Municipalities

The district includes the following municipalities:
 
Miahuatlán de Porfirio Díaz
Monjas
San Andrés Paxtlán
San Cristóbal Amatlán
San Francisco Logueche
San Francisco Ozolotepec
San Ildefonso Amatlán
San Jerónimo Coatlán
San José del Peñasco
San José Lachiguiri
San Juan Mixtepec, Miahuatlán
San Juan Ozolotepec
San Luis Amatlán
San Marcial Ozolotepec
San Mateo Río Hondo
San Miguel Coatlán
San Miguel Suchixtepec
San Nicolás
San Pablo Coatlán
San Pedro Mixtepec, Miahuatlán
San Sebastián Coatlán
San Sebastián Río Hondo
San Simón Almolongas
Santa Ana
Santa Catarina Cuixtla
Santa Cruz Xitla
Santa Lucía Miahuatlán
Santa María Ozolotepec
Santiago Xanica
Santo Domingo Ozolotepec
Santo Tomás Tamazulapan
Sitio de Xitlapehua

References

Districts of Oaxaca
Sierra Sur de Oaxaca